William Troy McLawhorn (born November 4, 1968) is an American musician who has been a guitarist in the rock band Evanescence since 2007. He has also worked with the bands Seether, Dark New Day, doubleDrive, Still Rain, and Gibraltar.

Early career
McLawhorn was formerly of the bands Seether, doubleDrive and Still Rain. After the demise of his first band, Still Rain, McLawhorn helped form doubleDrive in 1996 and landed a recording contract with MCA records in 1998. They scored a top 20 hit with the song "Tattooed Bruise" from their debut album 1000 Yard Stare. The band left MCA and signed a new deal with Roadrunner Records in 2001 and released their second album, Blue in the Face, with the song "Imprint" reaching into the top 20 also. McLawhorn was an active member until December 2003, when the band broke up. Following this, he joined Corey Lowery and Will Hunt and they began working on new material, which would later become the band Dark New Day, which also  included Clint Lowery and Brett Hestla. Dark New Day signed a recording contract with Warner Bros. Records in late 2004 and released the album Twelve Year Silence. The single  "Brother" became a top 10 hit.

Evanescence, Seether
In May 2007, McLawhorn was announced as the replacement for Evanescence's former guitarist John LeCompt, and played with the band through their The Open Door tour, which ended in December 2007. He remained active with Dark New Day while playing with Evanescence. However, McLawhorn eventually left Dark New Day in mid-2008 after joining Seether as a touring guitarist. After the success of Seether's subsequent tour, McLawhorn became their official lead guitarist.

From then until early March 2011, McLawhorn did various tours with Seether. He took part in recording with the band on projects such as Seether iTunes Originals, Rhapsody Originals, and on covers of Wham!'s "Careless Whisper" and Frank Sinatra's "I've Got You Under My Skin" as well. He also contributed to the album Holding Onto Strings Better Left to Fray. The first single from the record, "Country Song", co-written by McLawhorn, was released in the United States on March 8, 2011.

The same day, it was announced that McLawhorn had left Seether to pursue other interests. McLawhorn made the following statement on Facebook:

"Thanks for all of the support. You guys are great! I really enjoyed playing and creating music with the guys and I wish that I didn't have to leave especially now that the album that we worked so hard on is finally coming out. It was a hard decision and I wish them the best. I hope that I will see all of you when I find my next project."

In April 2011, Seether frontman Shaun Morgan took to his Twitter account to vent his frustrations regarding Troy's still unconfirmed new gig. The next day, McLawhorn further explained his departure on Facebook:

"You know...I have been laying low because I didn't want my departure from Seether to be any more dramatic than it has to be but I can't sit by while people come to my site and trash me. There are a lot of people who have been very supportive and I appreciate that so much. As for the haters...I can understand that people are passionate about their bands and the music. I am, too. That's why even when I was barely able to survive financially in this business I never quit because I genuinely love to play music with my friends. My leaving Seether was not about money at all. Ask yourselves this, why would I leave the band after we had just finished making an awesome record? Why? I was as excited as anyone to get out there and support it. I am losing money by leaving the band. You have to know that it was a very personal invasion of trust that led me to make my decision to leave. Anyone who knows me knows that I am not a vindictive person and I am just trying to find a place that I can be long term and play music with people that I can trust."

On June 12, 2011, Amy Lee of Evanescence announced on her Twitter account that McLawhorn had officially rejoined the band for their upcoming tour and new album due out on October 11, 2011.

McLawhorn filled in for Sevendust guitarist Clint Lowery on their 2013 tour with Coal Chamber.

Discography

Still Rain
Still Rain 
Bitter Black Water

Sevendust
Home (1999)

doubleDrive
1000 Yard Stare (1999)
Blue in the Face (2003)

Dark New Day
Twelve Year Silence (2005)
Black Porch (Acoustic Sessions) (2006)
Hail Mary  (2011)
B-Sides  (2011)
New Tradition (2012)

Seether
iTunes Originals – Seether (2008)
Rhapsody Originals – Seether (2008)
Finding Beauty in Negative Spaces (2009 reissue of the song "Careless Whisper")
Holding Onto Strings Better Left to Fray (2011)

Evanescence
Evanescence (2011)
Synthesis (2017)
The Bitter Truth (2021)

Equipment

Guitars

 Gibson USA Flying V 7-String
 Gibson Flying-V 1959
 Gibson Les Paul Studio Silverburst
 Gibson Les Paul Custom 1985
 Gibson Les Paul Custom 1990
 Gibson Explorer
 Gibson SG

 PRS Custom-Built (Cherry with 7 String)
 PRS SE Custom 24 7 Strings 
 PRS SE Clint Lowery
 PRS SE Baritone Custom
 PRS SE Custom 22
 PRS SE Custom 24
 PRS Singlecut
 PRS Starla Ltd
 Boulder Creek Acoustic Guitars

Effects
 Dunlop Jimi Hendrix Signature Wah JH1D
 Dunlop Zakk Wylde W MXR Overdrive
 Dunlop MXR KFK1 Ten Band EQ
 Dunlop MC401 Boost/Line Driver
 DigiTech Whammy 4
 TC Electronic Stereo Chorus Flanger
 BOSS DD-6: Digital Delay
 BOSS CE-5: Chorus Ensemble
 BOSS NS-2: Noise Suppressor
 BOSS TU-2: Chromatic Tuner

Amplifiers
 Orange PPC412 Closed Back Guitar Cab 4- 4×12 cabs
 Orange Rockerverb 100 MKII Head

Other
 Orange Amps Amplifiers FTSWCH Foot Switch
 Dunlop Tortex Pitch Black 488
 Dunlop Nickel Plated Steel Guitar Strings

References

External links

 

American rock guitarists
American male guitarists
Evanescence members
Living people
Place of birth missing (living people)
1968 births
Alternative metal guitarists
20th-century American guitarists
Dark New Day members
Seether members